The 3rd Korea Drama Awards is an awards ceremony for excellence in television in South Korea. It was held at the Kyungnam Culture and Arts Center in Jinju, South Gyeongsang Province on October 2, 2010, and hosted by Min Hyo-rin and announcer Lee Jae-yong. The nominees were chosen from Korean dramas that aired from October 2009 to September 2010.

Nominations and winners
(Winners denoted in bold)

References

External links 
  

Korea Drama Awards
Korea Drama Awards
Korea Drama Awards